Anolis boettgeri, also known commonly as Boettger's anole, is a species of lizard in the family Dactyloidae. The species is endemic to Peru.

Etymology
The specific name, boettgeri, is in honor of Enrique Böttger (1856–1944), a Peruvian who collected the type series.

Geographic range
A. boettgeri is found in Oxapampa Province, Peru.

Reproduction
A. boettgeri is oviparous.

Taxonomy
A. boettgeri has been referred to the Dactyloa punctata species group.

References

Further reading
Boulenger GA (1911). "Descriptions of new Reptiles from the Andes of South America, preserved in the British Museum". Annals and Magazine of Natural History, Eighth Series 7: 19–25. (Anolis boettgeri, new species, pp. 19–20).
Nicholson KE, Crother BI, Guyer C, Savage JM (2012). "It is time for a new classification of anoles (Squamata: Dactyloidae)". Zootaxa 3477: 1–108. (Dactyloa boettgeri, new combination, p. 82).
Poe S, Yañez-Miranda C, Lehr E (2008). "Notes on Variation in Anolis boettgeri Boulenger 1911, Assessment of the Status of Anolis albimaculatus Henle & Ehrl 1991, and Description of a New Species of Anolis (Squamata: Iguania) Similar to Anolis boettgeri ". Journal of Herpetology 42 (2): 251–259.

Anoles
Reptiles of Peru
Endemic fauna of Peru
Reptiles described in 1911
Taxa named by George Albert Boulenger